The postal counties of the United Kingdom, now known as former postal counties, were postal subdivisions in routine use by the Royal Mail until 1996. The purpose of the postal county – as opposed to any other kind of county – was to aid the sorting of mail by differentiating between like-sounding post towns. Since 1996 this has been done by using the outward code (first half) of the postcode instead. For operational reasons the former postal counties, although broadly based on the counties of the United Kingdom, did not match up with their boundaries: in some cases there were significant differences. The boundaries changed over time as post towns were created or amended.

According to the Royal Mail, the former postal county data no longer forms part of postal addresses. It was removed from the Postcode Address File database in 2000 and does not form part of its code of practice for changing addresses. Despite this, county data is routinely sold to companies, ostensibly to let them cleanse their own address data. As the former postal county data was the last to be in routine use, some organisations have continued to use this obsolete data as part of postal addresses. In 2009 the Royal Mail code of practice consultation included discussion of the possible replacement of the currently supplied 'alias data' with an up-to-date county information data field. In 2010 the regulator advised Royal Mail to cease supply of county data altogether and a timetable was put in place for this to occur between 2013 and 2016.

Differences
Counties were used in postal addresses from the earliest days of the Post Office, but over time the postal counties of many places did not match geographic counties or counties used for administrative purposes. There were several reasons for this:

Places part of a post town in another county
First, many of the approximately 1,500 post towns straddled county boundaries, and the postal addresses of all places in such areas included the postal county of the post town, regardless of their actual location. In a written answer in the House of Lords in 1963, Lord Chesham, Parliamentary Secretary at the Ministry of Transport estimated that about 7% of towns and villages with a post office lay in a postal county different from their geographical county. He went to explain that:

Examples, usually consisting of small villages near to county boundaries, included:

There were additional examples resulting from the 1974 reorganisation of local government:

The postal counties were subject to change over time as post towns near to county boundaries were amended. For example, Chinley in Derbyshire had a postal address of "Stockport, Cheshire" which was later updated to "High Peak, Derbyshire" when a new post town was created.

London

Second, the London postal district, which formed a special post town, did not conform to any administrative boundaries. The postal district was created in 1858 and has periodically been revised. However, at no point has its boundary coincided with either the metropolis (later County of London) of 1855–1965, which was somewhat smaller, or the Greater London area created in 1965, which was much bigger. For example, Wembley Stadium had a postal address of Wembley, Middlesex rather than London. Some London boroughs were split between multiple postal counties: for example Barnet had sections in the London postal district (e.g. Golders Green) and in the Middlesex and Hertfordshire postal counties (e.g. Edgware and East Barnet); with the NW7 postcode district touching the Greater London boundary to divide the three sections. Sewardstone, in the Epping Forest district of Essex, is the only locality outside Greater London to be included in the London postal district (E4).

Changes to geographic county boundaries
Third, the Royal Mail adopted some, but not all, of the local government reforms of 1965 and 1974/5. This caused postal counties in some areas to reflect boundary changes, while in other areas they did not. Although the Post Office did not follow the changes of the London Government Act 1963 with respect to the outer London suburbs, it did reflect the move of Potters Bar from Middlesex to Hertfordshire. In contrast, Middlesex remained part of the postal address for Staines, Sunbury and Ashford, which had transferred to Surrey. The 1960s saw an increase in the number of addresses the Post Office delivered to, but a decrease in the volume of mail sent, which caused a significant drop in revenue and a proportionate increase in operational costs. Furthermore, retaining the existing postal county boundaries was explained as largely due to cost reasons. The Times pointed out that this might cause confusion, noting that in future "children will no doubt wonder why their address should refer to a county in which they have never lived", but that "some people […] want the name of Middlesex preserved because of its historical associations".

The Local Government Act 1972 redrew the administrative county map of England and Wales outside Greater London. The Post Office was considering its policy in January 1973, and in November 1973 noted that "Greater Manchester" would be unlikely to be adopted because of confusion of the Manchester post town, but that Avon was likely to be introduced. When the local government changes came into force, the Post Office announced that the new counties would form part of postal addresses from 1 July 1974, and should be used as "soon as possible". Old counties could, however, still be used until 1 July 1975. It was stated that the rule applied to: "...addresses throughout England and Wales outside Greater London with the exception of Greater Manchester and Hereford and Worcester where addresses remain unchanged. In Humberside it is necessary to show whether an address is in North Humberside or South Humberside. Addresses in certain post-towns have not, in the past, included a county name; these addresses are unchanged, but the postcode should be shown. Addresses in Greater London are also unchanged as are addresses in any place where the new county bears the same name as the former one."<ref>{{cite book |title= Local Government in England and Wales: A Guide to the New System |publisher= HMSO |year= 1974 |isbn= 0-11-750847-0 |page=185 |chapter=Local Government Reorganisation and Postal Addresses}}</ref> The postal counties listed in 1961 that did not continue after the reforms were Cumberland, Rutland, Sussex, Westmorland and Yorkshire.

In Scotland, counties were entirely abolished for local government purposes in May 1975. The matter of postal counties was raised in the House of Lords in April 1975. Lord Beswick, Minister of State at the Department of Industry, stated that "the Post Office is consulting its customers in Scotland about the possible use of new postal addresses for Scotland based on the new local government Regions and Island Areas". In the event, the postal counties were not changed. Thus Alva, despite being in the Central Region after 1975, was still postally in Clackmannanshire. Gordon Oakes, Parliamentary Under Secretary of State at the Department of the Environment, explained the policy in a written answer to a question in parliament, shortly after the changes were brought in:

Special post towns
The postal county was omitted for addresses within 110 post towns. These were mainly either larger towns and cities or places where the county name was derived from the post town. These post towns were:

 ABERDEEN
 ABOYNE
 ANTRIM
 ARMAGH
 AYR
 BANFF
 BATH
 BEDFORD
 BELFAST
 BERWICK-UPON-TWEED
 BIRMINGHAM
 BLACKBURN
 BLACKPOOL
 BOLTON
 BOURNEMOUTH
 BRIGHTON
 BRISTOL
 BROMLEY
 BUCKINGHAM
 BUSHEY
 CAMBRIDGE
 CARDIFF
 CARLISLE
 CHELMSFORD
 CHESTER
 CLACKMANNAN
 COLCHESTER
 COVENTRY
 CREWE
 CROYDON
 DARTFORD
 DERBY
 DUMBARTON
 DUMFRIES
 DUNDEE
 DURHAM
 EDINBURGH
 ELLESMERE PORT
 EXETER
 FALKIRK
 GLASGOW
 GLOUCESTER
 GUERNSEY
 HEREFORD
 HERTFORD
 HOUNSLOW
 HUDDERSFIELD
 HULL
 INVERNESS
 IPSWICH
 ISLE OF MAN
 ISLES OF SCILLY
 JERSEY
 KINROSS
 KIRKCUDBRIGHT
 LANARK
 LANCASTER
 LEEDS
 LEICESTER
 LINCOLN
 LIVERPOOL
 LONDON
 LONDONDERRY
 LUTON
 MANCHESTER
 MILTON KEYNES
 NAIRN
 NESTON
 NEWCASTLE UPON TYNE
 NORTHAMPTON
 NORWICH
 NOTTINGHAM
 OLDHAM
 ORKNEY
 OXFORD
 PEEBLES
 PERTH
 PETERBOROUGH
 PLYMOUTH
 PORTSMOUTH
 PRESTON
 READING
 REDHILL
 RENFREW
 ROMFORD
 SALFORD
 SALISBURY
 SELKIRK
 SHEFFIELD
 SHETLAND
 SHREWSBURY
 SLOUGH
 SOUTHAMPTON
 SOUTHEND-ON-SEA
 STAFFORD
 STIRLING
 STOKE-ON-TRENT
 STRATHDON
 SUNDERLAND
 SWANSEA
 SWINDON
 TORQUAY
 TWICKENHAM
 WALSALL
 WARRINGTON
 WARWICK
 WATFORD
 WOLVERHAMPTON
 WORCESTER
 YORK

The towns of BRECON, CAERNARVON, CARDIGAN, CARMARTHEN, DENBIGH, FLINT, HUNTINGDON, MONMOUTH, MONTGOMERY and PEMBROKE also qualified as special post towns until 1974 as the name of the county was derived from the town. Following the Local Government Act 1972, addresses in these towns required the new postal county.

Postal counties in operation from 1974 to 1996listed with official abbreviations, if any''

England
Postal counties broadly matched the county boundaries established in 1974, unless noted otherwise under "geographic coverage".

Scotland
The postal counties of Scotland broadly followed the boundaries of the civil counties on the mainland. Offshore islands, however, were regarded as distinct counties for postal purposes. There was no postal county of Buteshire, which was instead divided between the Isles of Arran, Bute and Cumbrae.

Wales

Northern Ireland

Normally, counties in Northern Ireland are named with the word 'County', and not simply the county name, perhaps to avoid confusion with the towns of the same name.

After 1996

Postcode defined circulation
The Royal Mail ceased to use postal counties as a means of sorting mail following the modernisation of their optical character recognition equipment in 1996. Instead, using postcode defined circulation, the outward code (first half) of the postcode is used to differentiate between like-sounding post towns. In 2000 the postal county data was removed from the Postcode Address File database and was added to the Alias File, which is used to cleanse data of local, colloquial and "postally-not-required" details that have been added to addresses. According to Royal Mail policy the field is not updated and where new post towns are created they will not be assigned to a former postal county. In guidance to customers it is required that the correct post town and postcode must be included in addresses and a county is not required. As part of a "flexible addressing policy" customers can add a county, which will be ignored in the sorting process.

1990s local government reform
During the 1990s a reform of local government in England caused further changes to the locations in which the former postal counties did not match up to the geographic counties. Avon, Cleveland and Humberside were abolished as geographic counties and Rutland was reconstituted. This had the following effects on the relationship between the geographic and postal counties:

Hereford and Worcester was abolished and reconstituted as two separate counties once more, broadly matching the former postal counties. Greater London and Greater Manchester remained unaffected by the reform. Local government was also reorganised in 1996 in both Scotland (Local Government etc. (Scotland) Act 1994) and Wales (Local Government (Wales) Act 1994), such that in some places counties reverted to the historic names once again (e.g. Pembrokeshire), but in others the post-1974 names were retained (e.g. Powys and Gwynedd). As the Royal Mail had also declared postal counties redundant in 1996, the former postal county data was not updated to reflect these changes.

Extended usage
Despite Royal Mail stipulating that counties no longer form part of addresses, many organisations have continued routinely to include them as part of postal addressing, often simply combining Postcode Address File data with the data from the Alias File. Some organisations using software which requires a county to be included as part of a postal address have extended the use of counties to addresses in special post towns, which never needed them.

This continued use has caused customers in areas where there is discrepancy between the postal and geographic counties to complain to Royal Mail. Until 2007 the Royal Mail position was that under their current code of practice, changes to county data will not be considered. However, after a lengthy and well-organised campaign, the Royal Mail agreed to create a postal county of Rutland in 2007. This was achieved in January 2008 by amending the former postal county for all of the Oakham (LE15) post town and part of the Market Harborough (LE16) post town. In contrast, Seaton Delaval residents had unsuccessfully campaigned in 2004 to be removed from the former postal county of Tyne and Wear.

In 2009 the Royal Mail code of practice came up for renewal, and the regulator Postcomm held a public consultation on its future. Consultation guidance from the regulator indicated that although the former postal county data is obsolete, it was the last available data set to be in routine use and was therefore the most likely to be used by corporate customers for their address databases. It was also recognised that residential customers in some areas were not happy with this situation. The Royal Mail reconfirmed its preference for eliminating counties altogether from addressing, but also invited comments on providing a new and updated county data field, reflecting boundary changes. Postcomm found that many respondents objected to the use of obsolete counties.  In May 2010 Postcomm decided to advise Royal Mail to "discontinue provision of such information at the earliest opportunity".  However, because some existing software included the use of counties, Royal Mail was advised not to implement the change before 2013. The timetable announced by Royal Mail in July 2010 indicated that this was likely to happen between 2013 and 2016.

In 2013 Felicity MacFarlane stated the Royal Mail position: 
Between November and December 2013 a further consultation on the issue was conducted by the PAF Advisory Board that sought opinions on removing some or all of the county data from the Alias File and the results were published in January 2014.

Notes

References

External links 
 Information on Royal Mail Alias File

Counties
Counties of the United Kingdom
Vernacular geography
1996 disestablishments in the United Kingdom